William Borland (born 8 November 1996) is a Scottish darts player who plays in Professional Darts Corporation events.

Career
He has played in both BDO and PDC events, reaching the last 48 of the World Masters and the last 16 of the BDO World Trophy. Borland also plays in PDC Challenge Tour events, and thanks to his record in early 2019, he was able to qualify for the 2019 European Darts Open in Leverkusen. He made the quarter-finals of the 2019 PDC World Youth Championship on 4 November, but lost 6–3 to Keane Barry. On 19 January 2020, Borland won a two-year PDC Tour Card by finishing eighth on the UK Q School Order of Merit. He played with the card in 2020 and 2021.

On 17 December 2021, in Borland's World Championship debut, he was involved in an deciding leg which saw him throw a 9-dart leg against Bradley Brooks, becoming the first player to win a televised match with a nine-dart finish in Professional Darts Corporation history. With this victory, he secured a PDC Tour Card for 2022.

World Championship results

PDC
 2022: Second round (lost to Ryan Searle 0–3)

Performance timeline

PDC European Tour

Nine-dart finishes

On 17 December 2021, Borland became the first player in professional darts to win a televised match with a nine-dart finish in the deciding leg, beating English player Bradley Brooks. This is also his first nine-dart finish in a televised match.

References

External links

1996 births
Living people
Scottish darts players
Sportspeople from West Lothian
People from East Calder
Professional Darts Corporation former tour card holders
Darts players who have thrown televised nine-dart games